Asees Kaur (born 26 September 1988) is an Indian singer. She has participated in various singing reality shows including Indian Idol and Awaz Punjab Di. In 2021, her song "Raatan Lambiyan" from Shershaah, with Tanishk Bagchi, became a huge hit. She has won many awards including 2 Filmfare Awards and an IIFA Award.

Kaur aspired to become a playback singer at a very young age. She started singing Gurbani at the age of 5. She made her Bollywood debut with "Dildara Reprise" from Tamanchey. Since then, she has worked with various music composers on several Bollywood songs including "Ve Maahi" from Kesari, "Makhna" from Drive, "Bandeya Re Bandeya" & "Tere Bin" from Simmba, "Akh Lad Jave" and "Chogada" from Loveyatri and "Bolna" from Kapoor & Sons.

Early life and background

Kaur hails from Panipat, Haryana. Born on 26 September 1988, she started singing at the age of 5. It was her father who pushed her for reciting Gurbani. She learnt the Gurbani by herself and won accolades at the first attempt in competitions. She is an alumnus of Bal Vikas public School, Panipat, Haryana and completed her M.Com. from S D (PG) College Panipat.

As she grew up, she decided to take up singing professionally. She trained under Ustad Puran Shahkoti from Jalandhar. Her version of the Gurbani released in India and she garnered tremendous appreciation for the same. She started reciting Gurbani at various events. Her siblings were also actively involved in the Gurbani recitation.
Asees participated in a Punjabi reality show, Awaz Punjab Di, following which she came to Bombay and met various music composers.

Music career

Hindi discography
Asees is known for the song "Ve Maahi" that was trending on all platforms. She performed "Bolna" at the GIMA 2016 Fanpark. Her singles "Gal Karke" with Desi Music Factory, "Kisi Aur Naal" with VYRL Originals and "Mujhe Jeene De" with Panoctave India were instant hits and topped the charts.

She is currently managed by Tarsame Mittal Talent Management for her live shows.

Pop music 
In September 2021, Kaur along with Renuka Panwar featured at the Times Square in New York City for their song "52 Gaj Ka Daman".

Discography

Film songs

Non-film songs

Accolades

References

External links

 

1988 births
Living people
Bollywood playback singers
Indian women playback singers
21st-century Indian singers
21st-century Indian women singers
Women musicians from Haryana
Singers from Haryana
People from Panipat
Filmfare Awards winners